Singderella is a South Korean variety show. The show was originally aired every Thursday at 23:00 (KST) on  Channel A, but changed to air every Friday at 23:00 (KST) as of January 13, 2017.

Cast 
Season 1
 Kang Sung-yeon
 Kim Tae-woo
 Kim Hee-chul
 Moon Hee-joon
 Lee Soo-geun
 Choi Sung-keuk
 Han Suk-joon

Season 2
 Lee Soo-geun
 Moon Hee-joon
 Kim Hee-chul
 Kim Sung-kyu

Special Hosts
 Leeteuk (Super Junior) (Ep. 10)
 Lee Sang-min (Ep. 15-16)

Format 
Originally, after receiving the viewers' stories, and according to the story, the cast try to guess their ranks in Karaoke. But as of February 24, 2017, the show's concept changed and the number of cast decreased to four with three originals Lee Soo-geun, Moon Hee-joon, Kim Hee-chul and new addition Kim Sung-kyu.

The show's second season concept is that the cast and their special guests battle it out through a singing competition, where the winning performers are rewarded with the ingredients needed to make late night snacks.

List of episodes and guests 

 Note that the show airs on a cable channel (pay TV), which plays part in its slower uptake and relatively small audience share when compared to programs broadcast (FTA) on public networks such as KBS, SBS, MBC or EBS.

References 

South Korean variety television shows
Korean-language television shows
2016 South Korean television series debuts